In Greek mythology, Clio (/ˈkliːoʊ/, more rarely /ˈklaɪoʊ/; Ancient Greek: Κλειώ Kleiṓ means "made famous" or "to make famous"), also spelled Cleio, may refer to the following women:

 Clio, one of the 3,000 Oceanids, water nymph daughters of the Titans Oceanus and his sister-spouse Tethys. Her name means "fame-giver".
 Clio or Cleio, one of the 50 Nereids, the sea-nymph daughters of 'Old Man of the Sea' Nereus and the Oceanid Doris.
Clio, one of the Muses, daughters of Zeus and the Titan Mnemosyne.
Cleo, one of the 50 Danaides, daughters of the Libyan king Danaus. She married and murdered her cousin-husband Asterius.

Notes

References 

 Apollodorus, The Library with an English Translation by Sir James George Frazer, F.B.A., F.R.S. in 2 Volumes, Cambridge, MA, Harvard University Press; London, William Heinemann Ltd. 1921. . Online version at the Perseus Digital Library. Greek text available from the same website.
Gaius Julius Hyginus, Fabulae from The Myths of Hyginus translated and edited by Mary Grant. University of Kansas Publications in Humanistic Studies. Online version at the Topos Text Project.
Pausanias, Description of Greece with an English Translation by W.H.S. Jones, Litt.D., and H.A. Ormerod, M.A., in 4 Volumes. Cambridge, MA, Harvard University Press; London, William Heinemann Ltd. 1918. . Online version at the Perseus Digital Library
Pausanias, Graeciae Descriptio. 3 vols. Leipzig, Teubner. 1903.  Greek text available at the Perseus Digital Library.
Publius Vergilius Maro, Bucolics, Aeneid, and Georgics of Vergil. J. B. Greenough. Boston. Ginn & Co. 1900. Online version at the Perseus Digital Library.

Oceanids
Nereids
Greek Muses